Jörgen Pettersson may refer to:

Jörgen Pettersson (ice hockey) (born 1956), Swedish hockey player
Jörgen Pettersson (footballer) (born 1975), Swedish footballer